The ACM Prize in Computing was established by the Association for Computing Machinery to recognize individuals for early to mid-career innovative contributions in computing. The award carries a prize of $250,000. Financial support is provided by an endowment from Infosys Inc.

The ACM Prize in Computing was previously known as the ACM-Infosys Foundation Award in the Computing Sciences for award years 2007 through 2015. In 2016 it was announced that ACM Prize in Computing recipients are invited to participate in the Heidelberg Laureate Forum (HLF).

Recipients

See also

 List of computer science awards

References

Computer science awards
Association for Computing Machinery